Louis Roberts "Buzz" Stephen (born July 13, 1944) is a former Major League Baseball pitcher. He was born in Porterville, CA, which is where he currently resides today. He ended up choosing to attend Fresno State University.

Stephen, who was 6'4" tall and who weighed about 205 pounds, was originally drafted by the Houston Astros in the 25th round of the amateur entry draft in 1965. Opting not to sign, he waited until 1966 to be drafted again. This time, he was first drafted by the Minnesota Twins in the 1st round of the June Secondary Phase of the draft. He didn't sign that time, but again in 1966 he was drafted by the Twins in the second round of the January Secondary Phase of the draft. He chose to sign after being drafted that instance.

In his one year in the majors, Stephen's salary was $5,400 and he wore number 42. He also committed one error.

He was dealt along with Dick Baney from the Milwaukee Brewers to the Baltimore Orioles for Dave May before the trade deadline on June 15, 1970.

Stephen, who both threw and hit right-handed, only pitched in two major league games, making his debut on September 20, 1968. His last game was on September 25, 1968. In 3 career at-bats, his batting average was .000.

References

External links

1944 births
Living people
Baseball players from California
Major League Baseball pitchers
Minnesota Twins players
Fresno State Bulldogs baseball players
People from Porterville, California
Arizona Instructional League Pilots players
Charlotte Hornets (baseball) players
Dallas–Fort Worth Spurs players
Florida Instructional League Twins players
Jacksonville Suns players
Portland Beavers players
Rochester Red Wings players
Santa Barbara Dodgers players
St. Cloud Rox players
Vancouver Mounties players
American expatriate baseball players in Canada